The 1920 United States presidential election in Rhode Island took place on November 2, 1920, as part of the 1920 United States presidential election which was held throughout all contemporary 48 states. Voters chose five representatives, or electors to the Electoral College, who voted for president and vice president. 

Rhode Island voted for Republican nominee, Senator Warren G. Harding of Ohio, over the Democratic nominee, Governor James M. Cox of Ohio. Harding ran with Governor Calvin Coolidge of Massachusetts, while Cox ran with Assistant Secretary of the Navy Franklin D. Roosevelt of New York. 

Harding won Rhode Island by a margin of 31.19%. His victory in the New England states was helped in by the local popularity of his running mate, Calvin Coolidge, a traditional New England Yankee born in the small-town of Plymouth Notch, Vermont, who had started his political career nearby as Governor of Massachusetts.

, this is the last time a Republican won over sixty percent of the vote in Rhode Island.

Results

Results by town

See also
 United States presidential elections in Rhode Island

References

Rhode Island
1920
1920 Rhode Island elections